Husaynzada is a surname built from Husayn and the Persian suffix zada. Notable people with the surname include:

 Amir Hossein Hosseinzadeh (born 2000), Iranian footballer
 Mohammad Reza Hosseinzadeh (born 1964), Iranian economist and banker
 Mohammad-Ali Hosseinzadeh (1977–2016), Iranian principlist
 Tofig Huseynzade
 Mehdi Huseynzade
 Ali bey Huseynzade
 Mahammadali Huseinzadeh
 Ahmad Huseinzadeh
 Sabir Gusein-Zade

Iranian-language surnames
Azerbaijani-language surnames
Patronymic surnames
Surnames from given names